Andrea "Annie" Kritcher is an American nuclear engineer and physicist who works at the Lawrence Livermore National Laboratory. She was responsible for the development of Hybrid-E, a capsule that enables inertial confinement fusion. She was elected Fellow of the American Physical Society in 2022.

Early life and education 
Kritcher studied nuclear engineering at the University of Michigan. She moved to the University of California, Berkeley for graduate studies, where she earned a master's degree and doctorate in nuclear engineering. She spent summer 2004 at the Lawrence Livermore National Laboratory on an internship. Her first project involved analyzing data for the electron beam ion trap. Her doctoral research considered Thomson scattering from shocked compressed matter. She became a postdoctoral researcher at the Lawrence Livermore National Laboratory in 2009. Her postdoctoral research explored using X-rays to measure the properties of warm and hot dense matter (plasma), and measuring how nuclei interact with dense plasma. She made use of the LLNL Jupiter laser and the OMEGA laser at the University of Rochester.

Research and career 
Kritcher was made a permanent member of staff in the Weapons and Complex Integration's Design Physics Division of the Lawrence Livermore National Laboratory in 2009.

Kritcher works in nuclear engineering, with a particular focus on inertial confinement fusion, which looks to emulate the nuclear processes that take place in the sun by compressing and heating capsules full of thermonuclear fuel. High energy beams (photons or electrons) bombard the outer layer of the capsule, which explodes outward and generates a reaction force that accelerates the remainder of the capsule toward the center. The explosion creates a shockwave that travels through the fuel target, resulting in sufficient heat and compression for the fusion to begin. These capsules contain heavy isotopes of hydrogen (typically deuterium and tritium). Kritcher designed Hybrid-E, a target capsule that includes a high density carbon capsule and a deuterium-tritium fill tube. The capsule is encased in a hohlraum that converts the incident laser light into x-rays. Kritcher said that it was challenging to design the hohlraum such that it generated a symmetric implosion of the capsule. This involved confining the size of the entrance holes to enhance the energy that is coupled into the system, and a structure that can systematically adjust the wavelength of each beam to balance the X-ray energy required to drive the capsule to implode. The Hybrid-E capsule enabled inertial confinement fusion able to produce more than a megajoule of fusion energy. Hybrid-E represents the first time that it was possible to generate a burning plasma state that emits more energy than the energy required to initiate the fusion.

In 2022, Kritcher was elected Fellow of the American Physical Society. Her citation read, “for leadership in integrated hohlraum design physics leading to the creation of the first laboratory burning and igniting fusion plasma.”

Kritcher went on to study the behavior of ions in inertial confinement fusion, showing that the energy of neutrons produced from a deuterium–tritium plasma recorded experimentally was higher than could be predicted from the hydrodynamics-informed algorithms that simulate inertial confinement implosions.

Kritcher was the designer of the December 5, 2022 experiment that achieved fusion breakeven at the National Ignition Facility.

Awards and honors 
 2021 Finalist for Physics Breakthrough of the Year
 2022 Northwestern Michigan College Outstanding Alumni
 2022 Falling Walls Winner in Physical Sciences
 2022 Elected Fellow of the American Physical Society

Selected publications

References 

Living people
Year of birth missing (living people)
American nuclear engineers
University of Michigan alumni
University of California, Berkeley alumni
Lawrence Livermore National Laboratory staff
Fellows of the American Physical Society